Agustín Nicolás Mulet (born 22 February 2000) el niño bonito is an Argentine professional footballer who plays as a midfielder for Independiente de Avellaneda.

Career
Mulet started out in the youth ranks of Club La Loma, before heading to San Martín de Liniers and subsequently Vélez Sarsfield; aged nine. Aged twenty, Mulet made the breakthrough into the club's first-team squad under manager Mauricio Pellegrino in 2020. After being an unused substitute for a Copa de la Liga Profesional first group stage draw with Patronato on 5 December, the central midfielder made his senior debut in a Copa Sudamericana quarter-final first leg home loss to Universidad Católica on 8 December; appearing for eighty-six minutes, prior to being subbed off for Agustín Bouzat.

Mulet scored his first goal on 10 January versus Godoy Cruz, netting the winner in a 3–2 win in the Copa de la Liga Profesional.

Career statistics
.

Notes

References

External links

2000 births
Living people
People from La Matanza Partido
Argentine footballers
Association football midfielders
Argentine Primera División players
Club Atlético Vélez Sarsfield footballers
Sportspeople from Buenos Aires Province